Hits is a greatest hits album by American R&B group Dru Hill. It was released on October 17, 2005 by Def Soul Classics. It features hits like "Tell Me" "In My Bed", "How Deep Is Your Love", "5 Steps", and "Never Make a Promise".
It also features Sisqó's solo hits "Thong Song" and "Incomplete".

Track listing
"Tell Me"  from the Eddie soundtrack and Dru Hill 
"In My Bed"  from Dru Hill 
"Never Make a Promise"  from Dru Hill 
"Big Bad Mamma" (Foxy Brown featuring Dru Hill)  from How to Be a Player and Ill Na Na 
"5 Steps"  from Dru Hill 
"We're Not Making Love No More"  from the Soul Food (soundtrack)  
"How Deep Is Your Love" (Single Version featuring Redman)  original from the Rush Hour soundtrack and Enter the Dru 
"These Are the Times"  from Enter the Dru 
"The Love We Had (Stays on My Mind)"  from Enter the Dru 
"Beauty"  from Enter the Dru 
"You Are Everything"  from Enter the Dru 
"I Should Be..."  from Dru World Order 
"No Doubt (Work It)"  from Dru World Order 
"I Love You"  from Dru World Order 
"Thong Song" (Sisqó)   from Unleash the Dragon 
"Incomplete" (Sisqó)  from Unleash the Dragon 
"In My Bed (So So Def Remix)" (featuring Jermaine Dupri & Da Brat)

2005 greatest hits albums
Albums produced by Tim & Bob
Dru Hill albums